Good governance is the process of measuring how public institutions conduct public affairs and manage public resources and guarantee the realization of human rights in a manner essentially free of abuse and corruption and with due regard for the rule of law. Governance is "the process of decision-making and the process by which decisions are implemented (or not implemented)". Governance in this context can apply to corporate, international, national, or local governance as well as the interactions between other sectors of society.

The concept of "good governance" thus emerges as a model to compare ineffective economies or political bodies with viable economies and political bodies. The concept centers on the responsibility of governments and governing bodies to meet the needs of the masses as opposed to select groups in society. Because countries often described as "most successful" are liberal democratic states, concentrated in Europe and the Americas, good governance standards often measure other state institutions against these states. Aid organizations and the authorities of developed countries often will focus the meaning of "good governance" to a set of requirements that conform to the organization's agenda, making "good governance" imply many different things in many different contexts.

In politics

Good governance in the context of countries is a broad term, and in that regards, it is difficult to find a unique definition. According to Fukuyama (2013), there are two dimensions to qualify governance as good or bad: the capacity of the state and the bureaucracy's autonomy. They both complement, in the sense that when the state is more capable, for instance through the collection of taxes, there should be more autonomy because the bureaucrats are able to conduct things well without being instructed with a lot of details. In less capable states, however, less discretion and more rules setting are desirable.

Another way to think about good governance is through outcomes. Since governments carry out with goals like the provision of public goods to its citizens, there is no better way to think about good governance other than through deliverables, which are precisely the one demanded by citizens, like security, health, education, water, the enforcement of contracts, protection to property, protection to the environment and their ability to vote and get paid fair wages.

Similarly, good governance might be approximated with provision of public services in an efficient manner, higher participation given to certain groups in the population like the poor and the minorities, the guarantee that citizens have the opportunity of checks and balances on the government, the establishment and enforcement of norms for the protection of the citizens and their property and the existence of independent judiciary systems.

Lawson (2011) in his review of Rothstein's book "The quality of government: corruption, social trust, and inequality in international perspective" mentions that the author relates good governance to the concept of impartiality, which is basically when the bureaucrats perform their tasks following the public interest rather than their self-interest. Lawson differs with him in that this impartial application of law ignores important factors like the economic liberalism, which matters due to its relation with economic growth.

According to Bo Rothstein and Jan Teorell, the key characteristic of good governance is the impartiality of government institutions.

In business 
In corporate affairs, good governance can be observed in any of the following relationships:

 between governance and corporate management
 between governance and employee standards
 between governance and corruption in the workplace

The meaning of good governance in regards to corporate sectors varies between actors. Legislation has been enacted in an attempt to influence good governance in corporate affairs. In the United States, the Sarbanes–Oxley Act of 2002 set up requirements for businesses to follow. Whistleblowing has also been widely used by corporations to expose corruption and fraudulent activity.

Reform and standards
Three institutions can be reformed to promote good governance: the state, the private sector and civil society. However, among different cultures, the need and demand for reform can vary depending on the priorities of that country's society. A variety of country level initiatives and international movements put emphasis on various types of governance reform. Each movement for reform establishes criteria for what they consider good governance based on their own needs and agendas. The following are examples of good governance standards for prominent organizations in the international community.

United Nations
The United Nations (UN) is playing an increasing role in good governance. According to former UN Secretary-General Kofi Annan, "Good governance is ensuring respect for human rights and the rule of law; strengthening democracy; promoting transparency and capacity in public administration." To implement this, the UN follows eight principles:

 Participation – People should be able to voice their own opinions through legitimate immediate organizations or representatives.
 Rule of Law – Legal framework should be enforced impartially, especially on human right laws.
 Consensus Oriented – Mediates differing interests to meet the broad consensus on the best interests of a community.
 Equity and Inclusiveness – People should have opportunities to improve or maintain their well-being. 
 Effectiveness and Efficiency – Processes and institutions should be able to produce results that meet the needs of their community while making the best of their resources.
 Accountability – Governmental institutions, private sectors, and civil society organizations should be held accountable to the public and institutional stakeholders.
 Transparency – Information should be accessible to the public and should be understandable and monitored.
 Responsiveness – Institutions and processes should serve all stakeholders.

International Monetary Fund

The International Monetary Fund (IMF) was created at a United Nations (UN) conference in Bretton Woods, New Hampshire. In 1996, the IMF declared "promoting good governance in all its aspects, including by ensuring the rule of law, improving the efficiency and accountability of the public sector, and tackling corruption, as essential elements of a framework within which economies can prosper". The IMF feels that corruption within economies is caused by the ineffective governance of the economy, either too much regulation or too little regulation. To receive loans from the IMF, countries must have certain good governance policies, as determined by the IMF, in place.

World Bank
The World Bank introduced the concept in its 1992 report entitled "Governance and Development". According to the document, good governance is an essential complement to sound economic policies and is central to creating and sustaining an environment which fosters strong and equitable development. For the World Bank, good governance consists of the following components: capacity and efficiency in public sector management, accountability, legal framework for development, and information and transparency.

The Worldwide Governance Indicators is a program funded by the World Bank to measure the quality of governance of over 200 countries. It uses six dimensions of governance for their measurements, Voice & Accountability, Political Stability and Lack of Violence, Government Effectiveness, Regulatory Quality, Rule of Law, and Control of Corruption. They have been studying countries since 1996.

Effects

International humanitarian funding
Good governance defines an ideal that is difficult to achieve in full, though it is something development supporters consider donating to causes. Major donors and international financial institutions, like the International Monetary Fund (IMF) or World Bank, are basing their aid and loans on the condition that the recipient undertakes reforms ensuring good governance. This is mostly due to the close link between poor governance and corruption.

Democratization
Because concepts such as civil society, decentralisation, peaceful conflict management and accountability are often used when defining the concept of good governance, the definition of good governance promotes many ideas that closely align with effective democratic governance. Not surprisingly, emphasis on good governance can sometimes be equated with promoting democratic government. However, a 2011 literature review analyzing the link between democracy and development by Alina Rocha Menocal of the Overseas Development Institute stresses the inconclusiveness of evidence on this relationship.

Example
A good example of this close association, for some actors, between western democratic governance and the concept of good governance is the following statement made by U.S. Secretary of State Hillary Clinton in Nigeria on August 12, 2009:

Scholarly approaches

Nayef Al-Rodhan, in his 2009 book Sustainable History and the Dignity of Man: A Philosophy of History and Civilisational Triumph, proposed eight minimum criteria for ensuring good national governance.  Al-Rodhan's eight minimum criteria are: 1) participation, equity, and inclusiveness, 2) rule of law, 3) separation of powers, 4) free, independent, and responsible media, 5) government legitimacy, 6) accountability, 7) transparency, and 8) limiting the distorting effect of money in politics. In the book, he argues that good national governance is an important component in creating a history of sustainability for the human race. For Al-Rodhan, the eight minimal criteria of good governance are expressions of the fundamental values of democracy and more liberal constitutionalism.

The Tuskegee Study from 1932 to 1972 led to the signing of the National Research Act. This law outlined basic ethical ways in which research is to be carried out. The Department of Health, Education, and Welfare (DHEW) made regulations that required voluntary agreements for anyone who was to take part in their studies. Governance is used in scientific studies to ensure that policies are safe and ethical when studies are being done on human subjects. After the National Research Act there have been other organization put in place such as the Ethics Advisory Board, which reviews biomedical research. Many federal agencies adopted the Federal Policy for Protection of Human Rights in 1991. In 1995 President Bill Clinton established the National Bioethics Advisory Commission led by the Department of Health and Human Services with the task of reviewing regulations and policies to ensure the safety of research volunteers.

Criticism
According to Sam Agere, "The discretionary space left by the lack of a clear well-defined scope for what governance encompasses allows users to choose and set their own parameters."

In the book Contesting 'good' governance, Eva Poluha and Mona Rosendahl contest standards that are common to western democracy as measures of "goodness" in government. By applying political anthropological methods, they conclude that while governments believe they apply concepts of good governance while making decisions, cultural differences can cause conflict with the heterogeneous standards of the international community.

An additional source of good governance criticism is The Intelligent Person's Guide to Good Governance, written by Surendra Munshi. Munshi's work was created in order to "revive" good governance. Many individuals tend to either wave away and be bored with the idea of governance, or not have a clue to what it has at all. This book is a generalized discussion on what the purpose of good governance is and how it serves that purpose throughout our society. Munshi targets the book toward anyone doing research or just simply "those concerned with the issue of governance".

Rethinking Systems: Configurations of Politics and Policy in Contemporary Governance, written by Michael P. Crozier, is another work analyzing good governance. Crozier's article discusses the different dynamics of changes that occur throughout communication systems and the effect it has on governance. The idea of various perspectives is presented throughout the article. This allows the reader to be able to see what contemporary governance is like from different viewpoints. Crozier's motive was to also create an open mindset when referring to how governance and policy within society operate, especially with the constant changes occurring day to day.

Recent criticism has been aimed at the idea that good governance and institutions are one of the primary explanatory variables of economic growth, such as argued by Kaufmann and Kraay and Acemoglu and Robinson, which has put institutional reforms high on global development agendas. The criticism is fundamentally concerned with the issue that the relatively few countries which have managed to develop rapidly over the last 70 years did not have the "right" kind of institutions; in contrast, countries like China and South Korea have been plagued by corruption and a lack of checks-and-balances during their development trajectories. Or as the development economist Dani Rodrik put it: "A development strategy that focused on anti-corruption in China would not have produced anything like the growth rate that this country has experienced since 1978, nor would it have resulted in 400 million plus fewer people in extreme poverty."

As a result, it has been pointed out that anti-corruption efforts and government reforms can have very negative consequences in especially fragile countries there can be significantly bigger barriers to economic growth than corruption or institutional quality, and anti-corruption efforts and governance reforms often fail because of a suboptimal understanding of local socio-political contexts.

Various authors have furthermore argued that "good governance" provides a very unhelpful development agenda as it is unclear what the "right" kind of institutions are or how they should be realized even if we were to accept that they are necessary or helpful.

See also
 Developing country
 Due diligence
 Good government
 Good Governance Day
 Peace, order and good government

References

Sources
 found at Google Books
 found at Google Books
 Heritier, P. & Silvestri P. (Eds.), Good government, Governance, Human complexity. Luigi Einaudi's legacy and contemporary societies, Leo Olschki, Firenze, 2012.
 Quian, Yingyi (2003) 'How Reform Worked in China', in Rodrik.

External links 
 , UNESCAP
 Sustainable Governance Indicators
 World Bank Researchers Analysising Governance

Anti-corruption measures
Governance
International development
Political science terminology